The Dolmen-Chapel of São Brissos is a small chapel located in the parish of Santiago do Escoural in the municipality of Montemor-o-Novo in Portugal. It consists of the conversion of a prehistoric tomb into a Christian cult building. The chapel has been classified as a Property of Public Interest since 1957.

Description
The dolmen-chapel is situated beside the Valverde-N2 road, near the turn-off to Sao Brissos. The dolmen is of a Neolithic date and was built between the 4th and 3rd millennium BC. In the 17th-century a small whitewashed chapel was constructed around the surviving stones of the dolmen. The chapel narthex is formed by the dolmen.

References

External links

Dolmens in Portugal
Churches in Évora District
Conversion of non-Christian religious buildings and structures into churches
National monuments in Évora District